Robert may refer to:

Robert Ramsey (composer) (1590s–1644), English composer and organist
Robert Ramsey (congressman) (1780–1849), United States congressman from Pennsylvania

See also
Bob Ramsey (disambiguation)
Robert Ramsay (disambiguation)